A scabino (.) was a kind of magistrate or alderman in medieval Italy.

See also
 Italian assessors
 Scabinus, the medieval office throughout Continental Europe

Italian words and phrases